Irreligion in Brazil has increased in the last few decades. In the 2010 census, 8% of the population identified as "irreligious". Since 1970, the  Brazilian Institute of Geography and Statistics has included sem religião (Portuguese for no religion) as a self-description option in their decennial census, for people who do not consider themselves members of any specific religion, including non-affiliated theists and deists. In the 2010 census, 8.0% of the population declared themselves "irreligious".

The Constitution grants freedom of religion and thought to its citizens (Art. 5, VI). In 2008, the Brazilian Association of Atheists and Agnostics was founded; it promotes secularism and supports irreligious victims of prejudice.

Although the Federal Constitution guarantees religious tolerance to all its citizens (see article 5, item VI), it expressly prohibits all entities that make up the Federation to found and finance public cults and state churches controlled and coordinated by the Government – (see article 19, I), since until now the Brazilian State recognizes the "peculiar character" of the Catholic Church under the other religions in its legal system (see Article 16 of Decree 7107/2010), which is why the law recognizes the Virgin Mary, the mother of Jesus, as the "patroness of Brazil" (see Article 1 of Law 6,802 / 1980); the Constitution is sworn "under the protection of God" (see Preamble of the Federal Constitution); Catholic holidays (such as the day of Our Lady of Aparecida and the day of our Lord's birth) are recognized as national holidays by law (see Law 10.607 / 2002, Law 6.802 / 1980); the Catholic religion has an exclusive status for itself (see Decree 7107/2010); cities and states bear the name of Catholic saints; Catholic statues are exposed in public offices; the expression "God be praised" is present in all Real notes; and religious teaching exclusively Catholic in public schools is permitted in the country (see ADI 4439).

A 2009 survey showed that atheists were the most hated demographic group in Brazil, among several other minorities polled. According to the survey, 17% of the interviewees stated they felt either hatred or repulsion for atheists, while 25% felt antipathy and 29% were indifferent.

In 2022 a Datafolha survey found that non-religious people account for 25% of the Brazilian youth (aged between 16 to 24 year-old) nationwide. In the country's two largest cities of São Paulo and Rio de Janeiro the non-religious represent 30% and 34% of the people of the same age respectively, outnumbering evangelical, catholic and other religions youth. According to professors Ricardo Mariano and Silvia Fernandes there's a growing trend in Brazil of religious disafilliation among young people because of social liberalization and their individualistic beliefs often seen as conflicting with often harsh moral dogmas, strict codes of conduct and the increasing politicization of religions by the churches, especially the evangelicals.

Notable non-religious Brazilians 

 Alinne Moraes, actress
 Chico Anysio, atheist comedian and actor
 Drauzio Varella, atheist physician and TV personality
 Letícia Persiles, actress
 Marcelo Gleiser, skeptic physicist who suggests replacing mysticism with reason and scientific contemplation
 Nando Reis, atheist musician
 Nathalia Dill, actress
 Oscar Niemeyer, atheist architect and designer
 Paula Burlamaqui, deist actress

See also 
Religion in Brazil

References